

Visa requirements map

Holders of an ordinary Northern Cypriot passport can visit one country (Turkey) without the need to obtain an entry visa. The passport is accepted as a travel document by a limited number of countries because Northern Cyprus has limited international recognition. Usually, no visa is placed in the document. According to the Northern Cypriot Ministry of Foreign Affairs, the passport can be used for travel to the United States, United Kingdom, France, Qatar, and Turkey. United Arab Emirates and Tanzania also accept the passport of Northern Cyprus.

Consular protection of Northern Cypriot citizens abroad

Northern Cyprus is recognized only by Turkey, and consequently has only one embassy with de jure recognition, along with three consulates. However, it has representative offices in several countries.

See also List of diplomatic missions of Northern Cyprus.

See also

 Foreign relations of Northern Cyprus
 List of nationalities forbidden at border
 Northern Cypriot identity card
 Northern Cypriot passport
 Visa policy of Northern Cyprus
 Foreign relations of Northern Cyprus
 List of diplomatic missions of Northern Cyprus
 List of diplomatic missions in Northern Cyprus

References and Notes
References

Notes

External links
 Foreign Ministry of Northern Cyprus

Northern_Cyprus
Foreign relations of Northern Cyprus